Arnoldo Vizcaíno Rodríguez is a Mexican politician, founder and former chairman of the Party of the Democratic Revolution chapter in the state of Colima. He served in the LII Legislature of the Congress of Colima, where he served a stint as President.

Personal life
His daughter, Indira Vizcaíno Silva, is a politician who has served as a federal deputy, municipal president of Cuauhtémoc, Colima, and is the current Governor of Colima.

In 2021, he published a book of short stories called Desde la Ventana de los Recuerdos.

References

Living people
1954 births
Party of the Democratic Revolution politicians
Members of the Congress of Colima
Politicians from Colima
20th-century Mexican politicians